Kopani is a village in Polohy Raion (district) in Zaporizhzhia Oblast of southern Ukraine, at about  southeast of the centre of Zaporizhzhia city. It belongs to Orikhiv urban hromada, one of the hromadas of Ukraine.

The village came under attack by Russian forces in 2022, during the Russian invasion of Ukraine.

References

Villages in Polohy Raion